Gacrux it is the third-brightest star in the southern constellation of Crux, the Southern Cross. It has the Bayer designation Gamma Crucis, which is Latinised from γ Crucis and abbreviated Gamma Cru or γ Cru. With an apparent visual magnitude of +1.63, it is the 26th brightest star in the night sky. A line from the two "Pointers", Alpha Centauri through Beta Centauri, leads to within 1° north of this star. It is the nearest M-type red giant star to the Sun.

Nomenclature 

γ Crucis (Latinised to Gamma Crucis) is the star's Bayer designation. Since Gacrux is at roughly −60° declination. It was known to the ancient Greeks and Romans, but oddly in the era lacked a traditional name, and was visible north of 40° latitude due to the precession of equinoxes. The astronomer Ptolemy counted it as part of the constellation of Centaurus. The historical name Gacrux was coined by astronomer Elijah Hinsdale Burritt (1794-1838). In 2016, the International Astronomical Union organized a Working Group on Star Names (WGSN) to catalog and standardize proper names for stars. The WGSN's first bulletin of July 2016 included a table of the first two batches of names approved by the WGSN; which included Gacrux for this star.

The people of Aranda and Luritja tribe around  Hermannsburg, Central Australia named Iritjinga, "The Eagle-hawk", a quadrangular arrangement comprising Gacrux, Delta Crucis (Imai), Gamma Centauri (Muhilfain) and Delta Centauri (Ma Wei).

Among Portuguese-speaking peoples, especially in Brazil, it is also named Rubídea (or Ruby-like), in reference to its colour.

Physical properties 

Gacrux has the MK system stellar classification of M3.5 III. It has evolved off of the main sequence to become a red giant star, but is most likely on the red giant branch rather than the asymptotic giant branch. Although only 50% more massive than the Sun, at this stage the star has expanded to 120 times the Sun's radius. It is radiating roughly 760 times the luminosity of the Sun from its expanded outer envelope. With an effective temperature of 3,689 K, the colour of Gacrux is a prominent reddish-orange, well in keeping with its spectral classification. It is a semi-regular variable with multiple periods. (See table at left.)

The atmosphere of this star is enriched with barium, which is usually explained by the transfer of material from a more evolved companion. Typically this companion will subsequently become a white dwarf. However, no such companion has yet been detected. A +6.4 magnitude companion star lies about 2 arcminutes away at a position angle of 128° from the main star, and can be observed with binoculars. But it is only an optical companion, which is about 400 light years distant from Earth.

In culture 

Gacrux is represented in the flags of Australia, New Zealand, Samoa and Papua New Guinea as one of five stars which comprise the Southern Cross.

It is also featured on the Republican flag of Brazil, along with 26 other stars, each of which represents a state. Gacrux represents the State of Bahia. The position of the line passing through Gacrux and Acrux marks the local meridian of the sky observed from Rio de Janeiro, at 8:30 am. on 15 November 1889: the time when the republic was formally ratified.

See also 
 Aldebaran
 Betelgeuse

References

External links 
 

M-type giants
Barium stars
Semiregular variable stars

Crux (constellation)
Crucis, Gamma
4763
CD-56 04504
0470
108903
061084
Gacrux